Jewett William Adams (August 6, 1835 – June 18, 1920) was an American politician. He was the fourth governor of Nevada. He was a member of the Democratic Party.

Biography
Adams was born in South Hero, Vermont. He was educated in the common schools of Vermont.  He married Emma Lee on January 16, 1878, and the couple adopted a daughter, Frances R. Adams.

Career
Adams worked as a merchant and a rancher before moving west with the California Gold Rush in 1851. He ran a general store in Mariposa County, California until he was hired as paymaster on the estate of John C. Fremont in 1860. In 1864, he moved to Nevada, where he worked in mining, freighting, cattle raising, and owned a general store. He was elected the fourth lieutenant governor of Nevada, serving from 1874 to 1882.

In 1882 Adams was elected Governor, serving one term from 1883 to 1887. During his tenure, the site for the University of Nevada was moved to Reno, the silver industry flourished, and railroad development was promoted.

Adams became Superintendent of the United States Mint in Carson City from 1894 to 1898. In 1896, forming a partnership with William McGill, a cattleman, he built one of the largest ranches in the state of Nevada.

Death
In 1915, Adams and his family moved to San Francisco, where he died on June 18, 1920, at the age of 84. He is interred at Cypress Lawn Memorial Park, Colma, San Mateo County, California.

References

External links
 
 Biography
 Jewett William Adams Papers, 1883-1912, at The Bancroft Library
National Governors Association
The Political Graveyard
Nevada's First Ladies

1835 births
1920 deaths
Democratic Party governors of Nevada
Lieutenant Governors of Nevada
Politicians from Carson City, Nevada
Burials at Cypress Lawn Memorial Park
People from South Hero, Vermont
People of the California Gold Rush
American merchants
Politicians from San Francisco